can refer to:

 Kokubunji, Tokyo
 Kokubunji, Kagawa
 Kokubunji, Tochigi
 Kokubunji Station, a station in Kokubunji, Tokyo operated by Seibu Railway and JR East
 Seibu Kokubunji Line, a railway operated by Seibu Railway
 Kokubun-ji, Provincial temples in Japan
 87271 Kokubunji, an asteroid